Curdione is a chemical compound isolated from Curcuma wenyujin.

References

Sesquiterpenes